Drexel Park station (also known as Fairfax Road) is a SEPTA Media-Sharon Hill Trolley Line stop in Drexel Hill, Pennsylvania. It is located on Fairfax Road between Hillcrest and Garrett Roads and serves both Routes 101 and 102. Only local service is provided on both lines.

Trolleys arriving at this station travel between 69th Street Terminal in Upper Darby, Pennsylvania and either Orange Street in Media, Pennsylvania for the Route 101 line, or Sharon Hill, Pennsylvania for the Route 102 line. Despite the name, the closest thing to a park at this stop is located further north at Arlington Cemetery of Drexel Hill. Because the stop is in a residential area, there is no parking available.

This community was named as one of the top ten neighborhoods in the Philadelphia area by PhillyMag.com.

Station layout

References

External links

SEPTA Route 101/102 Drexel Park (SubwayNut.com)
Drexel Park's Home Owners Association

SEPTA Media–Sharon Hill Line stations